The 1965 Senior League World Series took place from August 19–21 in Des Moines, Iowa, United States. Monterrey, Mexico defeated El Campo, Texas in the championship game. This was the first SLWS held in Des Moines.

This year marked the first appearance by a Canadian team.

Teams

Results

References

Senior League World Series
Senior League World Series
Baseball in Iowa